The Saville Covered Bridge is a historic wooden   covered bridge located at Saville Township in Perry County, Pennsylvania. It is a  Burr Truss bridge, constructed about 1903.  It crosses Big Buffalo Creek.

It was listed on the National Register of Historic Places in 1980.

Gallery

References 

Covered bridges on the National Register of Historic Places in Pennsylvania
Covered bridges in Perry County, Pennsylvania
Bridges completed in 1903
Wooden bridges in Pennsylvania
Bridges in Perry County, Pennsylvania
Tourist attractions in Perry County, Pennsylvania
National Register of Historic Places in Perry County, Pennsylvania
Road bridges on the National Register of Historic Places in Pennsylvania
Burr Truss bridges in the United States